Alex Leavitt (born January 31, 1984) is a Canadian former professional ice hockey centre who last played for Braehead Clan in the Elite Ice Hockey League (EIHL).

Career
Undrafted, Leavitt formerly played in the American Hockey League for the Houston Aeros and the San Antonio Rampage, the ECHL for the Alaska Aces and Texas Wildcatters and the Central Hockey League for the Arizona Sundogs before embarking on a European career in 2008.

He signed with the Kassel Huskies in the Deutsche Eishockey Liga and stayed for two seasons before moving to the 2nd Bundesliga for the Ravensburg Towerstars where he had a league leading 87 point season, including 55 assists as the Towerstars went on to win the championship. He moved on to Finland's SM-liiga with HPK in 2011, but was unable to match the same form of previous European seasons. In 2012-13 season, Leavitt had a brief spell in Austria's Erste Bank Eishockey Liga for KHL Medveščak Zagreb before returning to Germany and the 2nd Bundesliga for the SERC Wild Wings.

He then split the 2013-14 season in Sweden's HockeyAllsvenskan for Oskarshamns AIK and Denmark's Metal Ligaen for the Aalborg Pirates. While with Aalborg, Leavitt led the league with 61 points, his highest tally since the 2010-11 season, and made the league's Second All-Star Team. In 2014, Leavitt returned to the Ravensburg Towerstars, who were now playing in DEL2 which replaced the 2nd Bundesliga the previous year. On June 1, 2015, Leavitt signed a one-year contract for the 2015-16 season to play with Scottish club, Braehead Clan of the Elite Ice Hockey League, where he contributed 66 points for the season and led the league in assists with 45. He re-signed for a second season with the Clan and scored 69 points.

Leavitt announced his intention to retire in March 2017, following two years with Braehead.

Career statistics

Awards and honours

References

External links

1984 births
Aalborg Pirates players
Alaska Aces (ECHL) players
Arizona Sundogs players
Canadian ice hockey centres
Everett Silvertips players
Houston Aeros (1994–2013) players
HPK players
Kassel Huskies players
KHL Medveščak Zagreb players
Living people
Notre Dame Hounds players
IK Oskarshamn players
Ravensburg Towerstars players
San Antonio Rampage players
Schwenninger Wild Wings players
Ice hockey people from Edmonton
Swift Current Broncos players
Texas Wildcatters players
Wisconsin Badgers men's ice hockey players
Braehead Clan players
Canadian expatriate ice hockey players in the United States
Canadian expatriate ice hockey players in Scotland